M-149 is a  north–south state trunkline highway in the Upper Peninsula of the US state of Michigan. It connects US Highway 2 (US 2) in Thompson with the Palms Book and Indian Lake state parks. The highway was originally designed in the 1930s and extended a few years later. The last major changes to the highway were made in the 1960s when it was completely paved for the first time.

Route description
M-149 is a rural two-lane highway that starts in the community of Thompson southwest of Manistique on Lake Michigan. It runs west-northwesterly through woodlands away from a junction with US 2 along a small pond in the area. The road curves to the north and passes the cemetery and some small farms south of a crossing with a line of the Canadian National Railway. North of the tracks, the road meets County Road 442 (CR 442) near Indian Lake. M-149 turns to the west at that junction while CR 442 runs easterly to connect to the main unit of the Indian Lake State Park. The highway continues to a junction with CR 455, which connects to the western unit of the state part, after which the trunkline turns to the northwest through forested terrain. The highway turns back to the west before intersecting another CR 442 in the area. At this junction, M-149 turns to the north where it continues for several miles until curving eastward. M-149 intersects the northern end of CR 455 and turns north once again until it terminates at the main gate to the Palms Book State Park, home of Kitch-iti-kipi (the Big Spring).

No part of M-189 is listed on the National Highway System. In 2009, the Michigan Department of Transportation conducted a survey to determine the traffic volume along the highway, reported using a metric called average annual daily traffic (AADT). The department determined that 421 vehicles a day used the highway south of the junction with CR 442 near Indian Lake State Park while 245 vehicles used remainder of the highway on average.

History
The Michigan State Highway Department (MSHD) designated M-149 along a gravel road in late 1930; the highway provided access from US 2 northerly to Palms Book State Park. A second highway, the first creation of M-125, was formed later in 1931 along another gravel road to connect US 2 southerly with the Thompson State Fish Hatchery. When US 2 was rerouted in the Manistique area in 1936, that highway was moved further south closer to Lake Michigan; M-149 was extended eastward along a section of the paved highway formerly a part of US 2 to connect with M-125 at the Indian Lake State Park. From that point south, M-149 replaced M-125 to Thompson. The former routing of US 2 became CR 442 except for the section used to extend M-149. In the latter half of 1960 or the beginning of 1961, the MSHD paved the sections of M-149 north and south of the former US 2 segment, completely hard-surfacing the roadway for the first time.

Major intersections

See also

References

External links

M-149 at Michigan Highways

149
Transportation in Schoolcraft County, Michigan